Modesto Molina (born 21 September 1968) is a Bolivian footballer. He played in seven matches for the Bolivia national football team from 1991 to 1993. He was also part of Bolivia's squad for the 1991 Copa América tournament.

References

External links
 

1968 births
Living people
Association football forwards
Bolivian footballers
Bolivia international footballers
People from Chiquitos Province